Sofía von Ellrichshausen (born in 1976) is an Argentinian architect, artist, and educator. She is known for her Brutalist architectural designs. Together with Mauricio Pezo, in 2002 she founded an art and architecture studio in Concepción, Chile. Their work has been exhibited at the Royal Academy of Arts in London, at the Venice Biennale International Architecture Exhibition, and is part of the permanent collections at the Art Institute of Chicago and the Museum of Modern Art in New York,

Education and academia 
Von Ellrichshausen was born in Bariloche, Argentina in 1976. She holds a degree in architecture from the Universidad de Buenos Aires. She has taught at Cornell University in Ithaca, New York, and the University of Texas at Austin.

Work 
Sofia von Ellrichshausen met Mauricio Pezo in Buenos Aires, and established an art and architecture studio in Chile that is known as Pezo von Ellrichshausen. Cien House, which the studio built for themselves, is located in one of the suburbs of Concepción, and is presented as an example of Chilean Modernist architecture in a 2019 article in The New York Times. Poli House, designed in 2005 by von Ellrichshausen, was included in the The Guardian's list of "The 10 best concrete buildings", and earned von Ellrichshausen the "Best Young Chilean Architect's Award". In 2009 The Architectural Review described their design for Casa Fosc as "playful".With Pezo, von Ellrichshausen was the curators of the Chilean Pavilion in the 2008 Venice Architecture Biennale, and she was a jury member at the 2018 Venice Biennale of Architecture.

Her work is part of the permanent collection at the Contemporary Art Museum in Santiago, Chile; the MoMA in New York City; and the Art Institute of Chicago.

Awards and honors 
The studio is a recipient of the Mies Crown Hall Americas Emerge Prize in 2014 for Poli House, the Rice Design Alliance Prize in 2012, the Iberoamerican Architecture Biennial Award (2006), and the Chilean Architecture Award (2006).

References 

Living people
1976 births
Argentine people of German descent
Women architects
Brutalist architects
University of Buenos Aires alumni
Argentine architects